Thyrsis or Tirsi may refer to:

 Thyrsis, the title of the first idyll by Theocritus
 Thyrsis (poem) (1865), a poem by Matthew Arnold
 Thyrsis, a character in the opera La Dafne by Marco da Gagliano
 Tirsi, one of the characters in Clori, Tirsi e Fileno, a comic cantata by George Frideric Handel
 Thyrsis, a character in Edna St. Vincent Millay's 1920 play, "Aria da Capo"
 Thyrsis's Cave, a natural cavern located in the Manifold Valley in Staffordshire, England
 Cupidesthes thyrsis, a butterfly in the family Lycaenidae
 Gangara thyrsis, commonly known as the giant redeye, a butterfly belonging to the family Hesperiidae
 Chilo thyrsis, a moth in the family Crambidae

See also
 Thyrsus (disambiguation)